Goce Delčev is a village in the municipality of Gazi Baba, Republic of North Macedonia.

Demographics
According to the 2021 census, the village had a total of 1402 inhabitants. Ethnic groups in the village include:
Macedonians 1.205
Persons for whom data are taken from administrative sources 86
Albanians 71
Romani 15
Serbs 10
Turks 2
Bosniaks 4
Others 9

Sports
The local football club is FK Goce Delčev Skopsko Pole and they play in Macedonia's fourth tier.

References

External links

Villages in Gazi Baba Municipality